Sean O’Neal (born November 29, 1975) is an American actor. He is best known for portraying Sam Anders in the television show Clarissa Explains It All. After Clarissa, he appeared in other TV series including Development Hell and the 2016 film Penumbra.

Filmography

Awards
O'Neal was nominated for two Young Artist Awards (at the time known as the Youth in Film Awards) for his work on Clarissa Explains It All: Best Young Actor Starring in an Off-Prime Time or Cable Series in 1991 and Best Young Actor Co-Starring in a Cable Series in 1992.

References

External links
 

1975 births
Living people
Male actors from Tampa, Florida
American male television actors
20th-century American male actors